Simon Yates (born 1963) is an English mountaineer.  He has described himself as 'an adventurer'. Yates is most well known as being one of two British mountaineers that conquered the previously unclimbed West Face of Siula Grande in the Huayhuash mountain range in the Peruvian Andes in 1985. He and Joe Simpson completed the difficult climb, at times enduring extreme weather conditions. They subsequently survived a dramatic series of events on the descent. Simpson recounted the story in the book Touching the Void, which was later adapted into a film.

Career

Together with Simpson, Yates climbed Siula Grand (6,344 metres/20,814 ft) in 1985, via the hitherto unconquered West Face. The climb was difficult and was accomplished in, at times, challenging blizzard weather conditions. The climbers commenced their descent via the peak's North Ridge which proved to be more difficult than they had anticipated. Shortly after the pair left the summit Yates fell through a cornice and plummeted down the  face they had just climbed but his fall was arrested by their climbing ropes. After a bivouac high on the peak, the pair continued their descent the following morning but then Simpson fell from an ice cliff on the North Ridge of the mountain, breaking his right leg and heel. To continue the descent, Yates then used their two ropes tied together (total length ) to lower Simpson down the mountain in stages in deteriorating weather conditions. Yates lowered Simpson  by this method and felt they were regaining control of the situation despite a worsening storm. However, although the pair had almost descended to the relative safety of the glacier, Simpson went over an unseen cliff edge as he was being lowered, which meant that he was hanging free with only Yates's hold on the rope to prevent him falling. Simpson was unable to get his weight off the rope and Yates could not lower him any further. To avoid being pulled off the mountain to almost certain death, Yates cut the rope. Yates dug a snowhole in the slope behind his stance and spent the rest of the night there. The following morning Yates completed his descent to the glacier and being unable to find Simpson he concluded his companion must have been killed, he returned to base camp that day. However, Simpson survived the fall and managed to climb and crawl out of the crevasse and reached base camp four days later.

Yates' rescue efforts contributed significantly to saving Simpson's life despite his decision, near the end of rescue, that he needed to cut their climbing rope to prevent a fatal fall. Yates' initially received some criticism for cutting the rope from some not in possession of the full facts relating to his rescue of Simpson. Simpson has always vehemently defended Yates' actions, saying he would have done it himself had the roles been reversed  and that his initial motivation for writing Touching the Void was to set out the full circumstances in response to ill-informed criticism of Yates.

Yates commented that after he moved away from Sheffield he had 'hardly seen Joe (Simpson) for nine years' until they went to Peru to film some scenes for the Touching the Void documentary. He later said that Simpson had become "a person he could not relate to" and that "climbing partners are like work colleagues. Some work colleagues go on to become friends, some become acquaintances and some people you work with - well, you rather wish you didn't."

Immediately after return from the Siula Grande climb, Yates went to the European Alps and climbed the North Face of the Eiger partnered by John Silvester.  Subsequently he has participated in many expeditions including those that made the first ascents of Laila Peak and Nemeka in Pakistan and several expeditions to the Cordillera Darwin in Chile.  In 2007 Yates acted a guide to two Icelandic climbers in a successful attempt to climb Ama Dablam (6,812 metres/22,349 ft) in the Khumbu region of Nepal to the south of the Mount Everest massif and a film of the expedition was made: Ama Dablam: Beyond the Void. In July 2009, Yates successfully led a group of four clients to the summit of Lenin Peak (7134 m). In September 2010, Yates planned to return to the Cordillera Huayhuash 25 years after his climb with Simpson, to lead a group of trekkers to the base camp of Siula Grande and to the viewpoint over Cerro Bella Vista, from where the path along which Simpson crawled to safety can be seen.

Yates' first published writings were his contribution to Joe Simpson's book Touching the Void; approximately 15% of that book is written by Yates. Subsequently he has authored three autobiographical books about mountaineering. The first, Against the Wall, is about an expedition to climb a new route on the Central Torres del Paine in Chilean Patagonia and was short-listed for the Boardman Tasker Prize for Mountain Literature. The book details how that particular climb led to Yates re-evaluating the priorities in his life as a climber. The Flame of Adventure describes a series of climbing expeditions around the world. His most recent book, The Wild Within, describes expeditions to the Cordillera Darwin in Tierra del Fuego, the Wrangell St-Elias ranges on the Alaska-Yukon border, and eastern Greenland.

Personal life
Yates was born in Croft, Leicestershire, England and educated at Lutterworth Grammar School. In the 1980s he moved to Sheffield to complete a degree in biochemistry at the University of Sheffield. After graduation Yates concentrated on mountaineering and did rope access work to support himself financially.

Yates currently lives in Cumbria (north west England) with his wife Jane Yates and their two children Lewis and Maisy Yates. Yates' wife & children have accompanied him on some of his later expeditions.

See also
 List of climbers, alpinists and mountaineers

References

World Expeditions

External links
 Simon's own Mountaineering Guide site - Mountain Dream

English mountain climbers
Living people
People from Blaby District
1963 births
People educated at Lutterworth College